François-Réal Angers ( 20 November 1812 – 27 March 1860) was a lawyer and writer from Quebec, Canada. He was born in Pointe-aux-Trembles (Neuville, Quebec) into a family of farmers. 

He collaborated to the foundation of the short lived Société littéraire in 1830. In 1836, while studying law, he published the booklet Système de sténographie, applicable au français et à l'anglais. The following year, he was received at the bar and became the recorder of proceedings in the Legislative Assembly of Lower Canada. He later published his chronicle Révélations du crime ou Cambray et ses complices (English translation : The Canadian brigands; an intensely exciting story of crime in Quebec, thirty years ago!, Montreal, 1867). He married Louise Panet in 1853. 

Between 1851 and 1860, Angers collaborated to the work Décisions des tribunaux du Bas-Canada.

External links

Biography at the Dictionary of Canadian Biography Online

1812 births
1860 deaths
Canadian non-fiction writers
19th-century Canadian lawyers
Writers from Quebec
French Quebecers
Canadian non-fiction writers in French